Aaron Watkins (born July 24, 1982) is an American professional golfer who plays on the Nationwide Tour.

Watkins was born in Winter Park, Florida. He played college golf at Kansas State University, before turning professional in 2004.

Watkins spent two years playing on the Gateway Tour where he recorded one win. He has since played on the Nationwide Tour in 2007 and 2010–12. His best finish was a playoff loss to Steve Pate at the 2010 Pacific Rubiales Bogota Open.

In 2009, Watkins played on the PGA Tour having come through all three rounds of qualifying school. His best finish was tie for 7th at the Zurich Classic of New Orleans, but made only six cuts and lost his card at the end of the year.

Watkins qualified for the 2012 U. S. Open and finished in a tie for 15th.

In 2011 Watkins' wife Jessica gave birth to a daughter, Ady.

Professional wins (2)
2004 Southern Arizona Open
2006 Desert Series (Gateway Tour)

Playoff record
Nationwide Tour playoff record (0–1)

Results in major championships

"T" = tied
Note: Watkins only played in the U.S. Open.

See also
2008 PGA Tour Qualifying School graduates
2012 PGA Tour Qualifying School graduates

References

External links

American male golfers
Kansas State Wildcats men's golfers
PGA Tour golfers
Golfers from Florida
Golfers from Arizona
Sportspeople from Winter Park, Florida
Sportspeople from Mesa, Arizona
1982 births
Living people